Paul Mayer (1848 in Lüdenscheid – 1923 in Jena) was a German zoologist.

He studied several groups of marine animals, especially the Crustacea, in particular the Caprellidae. Mayer is especially known for his systematizing of histological techniques. He also wrote the treatise  in 1920. He was a student of Ernst Haeckel.

Works
Partial list
1882 Caprelliden. Fauna und Flora des Golfes von Neapel, 6, 1–201.
1890 Die Caprelliden des Golfes von Neapel und der angrenzenden Meeres-Abschnitte. Fauna und Flora des Golfes von Neapel, 17, 1–55.
1903 Die Caprelliden der Siboga-Expedition. Siboga Expeditie, 34, 1–160.

External links
Treccani
petymol

1848 births
1923 deaths
20th-century German zoologists
German carcinologists
People from Lüdenscheid
19th-century German zoologists